Sam Kersten (born 30 January 1998) is a Dutch professional football player who plays for Eerste Divisie club PEC Zwolle.

Club career
Kersten played for six seasons in the FC Den Bosch youth setup. He made his professional debut in the Eerste Divisie for FC Den Bosch on 2 December 2016 in a game against FC Dordrecht. Kersten then signed a multi-year deal with Den Bosch after making a number of first team appearances.

Kersten primarily plays as a central defender.

References

External links
 
 Career stats & Profile - Voetbal International

1998 births
Footballers from Nijmegen
Living people
Dutch footballers
FC Den Bosch players
PEC Zwolle players
Eredivisie players
Eerste Divisie players
Association football defenders